Lebowitz is a surname, and may refer to:

People
 Baruch Ber Lebowitz (1862 - 1939), Belarusian Talmudic scholar
 Fischl Lebowitz, birth name of Fred Lebow (1932–1994), founder of the New York City Marathon
 Fran Lebowitz (born 1950), American writer known for her sardonic social commentary
 Joel Lebowitz (born 1930), mathematical physicist 
 Mike Lebowitz (born 1977), American attorney and expert in the field of military law
 Rachel Lebowitz (born 1975), Canadian writer

See also
 Mike Lebovitz, stand-up comedian

Fictional characters 
 Fawn Lebowitz, a minor character in a Victorious episode named "Crazy Ponnie" played by Jennette McCurdy

See also
 Libowitz
 Liebowitz
 Leibowitz
 Leibovitz

Jewish surnames